¡Viva! Vaughan is a 1965 studio album by Sarah Vaughan, orchestrated and conducted by Frank Foster, and produced by Quincy Jones.

Reception

The Allmusic review by Ken Dryden awarded ¡Viva! Vaughan three and a half stars and said "Vaughan is in great voice throughout the date and the material is generally first-rate, except for the bland "Night Song"...Unfortunately, the bossa nova selections ("The Boy From Ipanema" and "Quiet Nights") are burdened with pedestrian string arrangements that date the music as much as the generally uninspired Latin percussion. It's likely that this lack of focus confused the record-buying public as to what type of music this was and caused it to be overlooked."

Track listing

Personnel
 Sarah Vaughan – vocals
 Jerome Richardson – flute
 Wayne Andre – trombone
 Dick Hixson – bass trombone
 Bernard Eichen – violin
 Barry Galbraith – guitar
 Bob James – piano
 Willie Bobo – percussion
 Bobby Donaldson – drums
 George Duvivier – double bass
 Frank Foster – arranger, conductor
 Quincy Jones – producer

References

Sarah Vaughan albums
1965 albums
Mercury Records albums
Albums produced by Quincy Jones
Albums arranged by Frank Foster (musician)
Albums conducted by Frank Foster (musician)
Bossa nova albums